Templetonia stenophylla, commonly known as leafy templetonia, is a species of flowering plant in the family Fabaceae. It is endemic to eastern Australia.

References 

Brongniartieae
Fabales of Australia
Flora of New South Wales
Flora of Queensland
Flora of South Australia
Flora of Victoria (Australia)
Taxa named by Ferdinand von Mueller